You & I is the 2008 debut album from Auckland pop-rock band Cut Off Your Hands. It was released in 2009 in the US. It was recorded with well-known indie producer Bernard Butler. Their song "Happy as Can Be" featured in the video game by EA Sports, FIFA 10.

Track listing
The album was released under different labels in the US vs Australia/NZ.

CD

Additional DVD (NZ/Aus)
In Australia and New Zealand the album came with an additional DVD with five tracks:

Credits
 Artwork By Art Direction – Joel Kefali, Special Problems
 Edited By – Mako Sakamoto
 Engineer – Bernard Butler (tracks: 1-3, 5-12), Seb Lewsley* (tracks: 1-3, 5-12), Tom Stanley (track 4)
 Mastered By – Chris Potter
 Photography [Original] – Arnold Skolnick
 Producer – Bernard Butler (tracks: 1-3, 5-12), Stephen Street (track 4)
 Technician [Assisted By] – Jackson Gold
 Written-By – Cut Off Your Hands, Nick Johnston
 Whistle (track 4) – Dave Shrimpton

Charts

Critical reception
Reception was generally favourable. Critics praised their lively performances, though some took issue with the banal topics for interest such as heartbreak.

References

2008 debut albums
Cut Off Your Hands albums